This is a List of notable Old Olavians, these being former pupils of St Olave's and St Saviour's Grammar School and its predecessors, St Olave's and St Saviour's.

Academic
 Prof H. B. Acton (1908–1974), Professor of Philosophy from 1945–64 at Bedford College (London), Director from 1962–4 of the Royal Institute of Philosophy, and President from 1952–3 of the Aristotelian Society
 Prof Sir William Ashley (1860–1927), economic historian, Professor of Economic History from 1892–1901 at Harvard University, and Professor of Commerce from 1901–25 at the University of Birmingham
 Prof Richard Bird, Professor of Computation from 1996–2008 at the University of Oxford and Director from 1998–2003 of the Oxford University Computing Laboratory
Prof David Conway, philosopher
 Prof Harold Ellis CBE, Emeritus Professor of Surgery, King's College London School of Medicine and Dentistry
 William Heberden FRS, (1710–1801) physician, coined the term 'Angina pectoris'
 Prof Peter Littlewood FRS, Professor of Physics since 1997 at the University of Cambridge, and Head of the Cavendish Laboratory since 2005
 Charles W Lloyd, The Master of Dulwich College from 1967 to 1975
Prof Sir Desmond Arthur Pond, Professor of Psychiatry, Chief Scientist at the Department of Health and Social Security.
 Arnold Powell (1889–1963), headmaster and clergyman
 Alfred Barton Rendle FRS, Botanist
 Sir Michael Scholar, (born 1942) President, St John's College, Oxford since 2001, and Chairman since 2008 of the UK Statistics Authority
 Prof Thomas Frederick Tout, (1855–1929) historian, Professor of History from 1890–1925 at the University of Manchester, President from 1910–2 of the Historical Association

Business
 Sir Leon Bagrit, pioneer of automation; Chairman and Managing Director of Elliot Automation Ltd. Since 1963, and Deputy Chairman of English Electric Company since 1967; a director of the Royal Opera House; Reith Lecturer 1964.
 Craig Boundy, Chief Operating Officer of Experian

Clergy
 Most Rev. Leonard James Beecher CMG, Bishop of Mombasa 1953–1964; Archbishop of East Africa 1960
 Rt Rev John Boys, Bishop of Lebombo from 1948–51, and of Kimberley and Kuruman from 1951–60
 Rt Rev George Eric Gordon, Bishop of Sodor and Man from 1966–74
 John Harvard, (1607–1638) founder of Harvard University
 Frederick Henry Ambrose Scrivener, theologian
 William Sherlock, (1641–1707) English church leader
 William Van Mildert, (1765–1836) Bishop of Durham; founder of the University of Durham
 Peter Sterry, theologian, Oliver Cromwell’s private chaplain

Politics and public service
 Sir William Artherton (1806-1864), Attorney General from 1861-1863, MP for Durham City from 1852-1864
 Aaron Bell, Conservative MP for Newcastle-under-Lyme
 Godfrey Bloom, UKIP MEP from 2004-2014 for Yorkshire and the Humber
 Frederick Boland (1904-1985), Irish diplomat, president of the General Assembly of the United Nations
 Abba Eban, (1915–2002) Israeli Ambassador to the United Nations; Israeli Minister for Foreign Affairs; Israeli Deputy Prime Minister
 Henry Hartley Fowler, 1st Viscount Wolverhampton, (1830–1911) politician
 Charles Hill, Baron Hill of Luton (1904-1989), National Liberal and Conservative MP for Luton from 1950–63, Postmaster General from 1953–7, and Chairman from 1967–77 of the Board of Governors of the BBC
 Sir Charles Edward Lewis, Bt, MP for Londonderry City 1872-1886 and Antrim North 1887-1892
 Kenneth Lindsay, Labour MP for Kilmarnock Burghs 1933–1945; Civil Lord of the Admiralty 1935–1937; Parliamentary Secretary, Ministry of Education 1937–1940
 Sir Alan Marre, K.C.B., Civil Servant; Deputy Secretary, Ministry of Health 1964–66; Ministry of Labour 1966; Joint Permanent Secretary, Ministry of Health and Social Security 1968; Parliamentary Commissioner for Administration (the Ombudsman) 1971
 Sir William Murison, Chief Justice of Straits Settlements and Singapore
 Chris Philp, Conservative MP for Croydon South
 Alderman Sir William Anderson Rose, MP, Businessman, Lord Mayor of London 1874
 Sir Roger Sims Conservative MP from 1974–97 for Chislehurst, Vice president of the NSPCC, Vice President of the Royal College of Nursing, Member of the Royal Choral Society since 1950
 Alderman David Henry Stone, Lord Mayor of London
 Sir Sydney Waterlow, 1st Baronet (1822–1906), Lord Mayor of London 1872, Member of Parliament

Military
 Maj-Gen Bruce Brealey, General Officer Commanding HQ Theatre Troops since 2008
 Wing Commander Andy Green, (1962– ) RAF fast jet pilot; current holder of the world land speed record
 Air Marshal Sir Brian Reynolds KCB CBE, Commander in Chief from 1956–9 of RAF Coastal Command
 Alfred Oliver Pollard, Victoria Cross recipient, author

Sport
 David Akinluyi, signed professionally with Northampton Saints 2006
 Billy Mehmet, international footballer (Dunfermline Athletic, St Mirren, Gençlerbirliği S.K., Perth Glory, Republic of Ireland U21)
 Nicholas Osipczak, Professional Mixed Martial Artist; cast member of SpikeTV's The Ultimate Fighter: United States vs. United Kingdom

The arts
 Samuel Laman Blanchard, (1804–1845) author and journalist
 A. B. Campbell radio broadcaster
 Martin Carthy, folk singer
 William Cole LVO, Master of the Music at the Queen’s Chapel of the Savoy from 1954–94, and Professor of Harmony and Composition from 1948–62 at the Royal Academy of Music
 Matthew Crosby, comedian and actor
 Johnny Douglas (conductor), film score composer
 Lawrence Durrell, novelist, poet, dramatist, and travel writer
 Mark Ellis, School years 1971–1978, record producer better known as Flood
 Andrew Ford, composer
 Kelvin Gosnell, writer & editor (co-founder of 2000 AD)
 Edmund Gwenn, Academy award winning actor
 Nish Kumar, (School years 1996-2003) comedian
Dr Noël Harwood Tredinnick BEM FRSCM British composer, organist, orchestrator and conductor.
Kevin Armstrong (School years 1970-1974) guitarist (David Bowie and Iggy Pop)

Staff alumni
 Giovanni Baldelli, anarchist theorist
 Bryan West, rugby player

References

External links
 Distinguished Old Olavians

 
Olavians